The Big Ten Conference Women's Basketball Freshman of the Year is an annual college basketball award presented to the top women's basketball freshman in the Big Ten Conference.

Key

Winners

Winners by school

References

Awards established in 1983
Freshman of the Year